Waseem Mirza born in Peterborough, England, is a British Actor, who transitioned to acting from a career as a broadcast TV News Presenter and Sci-Tech Journalist. Prior to his role on the DC Entertainment series, Pennyworth: The Origin of Batman's Butler, he had won industry recognition for his work in British Television Journalism.  As an Actor, he portrayed the physician Dr. Hamid in the 21 minute narrative: Beyond Belief - Talking to the Dead (2021). The film garnered awards in two categories at the Crownwood International Film Festival in July 2021. The awards were Best Director and Best Supporting Male Actor, awarded to Haider Zafar and Scott Samain respectively. Since then, the film has won further acclaim at The British Shorts Awards, LiftOff London and The White Deer Film Festival.

On his most recent filming for the Warner Bros. production: Pennyworth The Origin of Batman's Butler (Season 3 - 2022), HBO Max had publicly announced that Season 3 would be broadcast and become available to stream in 2022. The series was subsequently named as a "Lionsgate+ Original" for its third-season premiere in the UK streaming market across various providers including directly at Lionsgate+ (the new name for StarzPlay in the country) on 11 December 2022.  This TV series is celebrated for being a comic book adaptation of the Batman origin story. It was announced that the series would not be returning due to a change in direction at DC Studios.

Early life & career beginnings
Mirza was born in Peterborough, England and graduated from the University of Lincoln located in Lincolnshire, England. As a child he appeared in the Nickelodeon show - School of The Week broadcast to a UK audience. However, it was his appearance as a child, on the video game shows on Sky One: Games World and then Games World Live (produced by Hewland International on behalf of BSkyB) which kickstarted his media and broadcasting ambitions.  He got his first real start in television when he was hired by BBC World as the first TV Researcher for the technology news show Click whilst on a placement from university. This led to a formal contract in his final year of studies. Here, Mirza received his first Presenter (Host) credit for the "Net News" segment, when he stood-in during one episode for the former Presenter of the show, Stephen Cole. He also received his first television reporter credit when reporting on the future of the home computer verses new internet devices  and digital music piracy.

TV / film career developments

Mirza is a British actor, TV presenter and reporter with credits including the BBC drama series Doctors. He was also hired by BBC News as a TV News Journalist while he was still studying in his final year at the University of Lincoln, England. By the time of graduation, he'd already worked for BBC News 24, BBC World News Channel and the BBC Asian Network before joining BBC Look East in the East of England.

He has also worked on the BBC's flagship international technology news feature show Click. He's been named TV Hotshot by Broadcast (magazine), as part of their influential annual list of "Britain's Top TV Talent Under 29."

Before his debut in British TV News and Factual Television, he landed a role as a double for the daytime BBC drama series Doctors, playing the character Dr. Rana Mistry, played originally by Akbar Kurtha. Mirza also co-presented a National Film & Television School pilot entertainment show, produced by final year students, and which was partly funded by the BBC as part of its wider involvement with the educational establishment. As a child, he appeared as himself on the Nickelodeon show called School of the Week presented by Jenny Powell. The show featured his school, the Deacon's School, which is now known as the Thomas Deacon Academy. Interestingly, Mirza was featured in the role of a screaming man in 2020 for a music video by Zebra Katz titled "Ish". In the same year, he appeared in the TV series Easy Ways to Live Well as himself. In 2021, he appeared in the short film called There is Always Hope. This film is presently nominated in the "Film" category for the United Kingdom Charity Film Awards, where votes are still being accepted.

Mirza's appearance in the DC Comics Batman origin series Pennyworth as well as a role in the TV Mini Series Witness Data, are both expected in 2022 according to the Internet Movie Database. In addition, his podcast series, FutureTECH, is currently in production with an expected launch in 2022. Mirza is widely known to be an electric car advocate having covered the latest developments in the technology for BBC Television. He reported on Britain's first case of Charge Rage according to the BBC. His electric driving adventure went viral among tech-lifestyle blogs when reporting from a Motorway Service Station in South East Britain. Notably, Mirza is a technology expert and was transported virtually into the videogame Minecraft, as part of a short BBC film about the Professional Gamer and YouTuber - DanTDM.  He appeared visibly sick, when describing on-camera for the BBC, the taste and texture of the world's first edible 3D-printed raspberry. Mirza is a member of the Association of British Science Writers and also Equity, which was formerly known as the British Actor's Equity Association.

Filmography

References

BBC newsreaders and journalists
British actors
British television newsreaders and news presenters
British reporters and correspondents
British people of South Asian descent
Living people
People from Peterborough
Alumni of the University of Lincoln
Year of birth missing (living people)